Arthur Dixon (5 October 1879 – 1946) was an English professional association footballer who played as a full back.

References

English footballers
Association football defenders
Nelson F.C. players
Burnley F.C. players
Tottenham Hotspur F.C. players
Bradford (Park Avenue) A.F.C. players
English Football League players
1879 births
1946 deaths
Trawden Forest F.C. players
People from Barrowford